Nolina interrata is a rare species of flowering plant known by the common names Dehesa nolina and Dehesa beargrass. It is known from about ten occurrences in central San Diego County, California, and fewer than 100 individual plants on land across the border in Baja California. The plant was first described in 1946 when found at the type locality near El Cajon, California, and all the individuals known in California are located within a six-square-mile area there. Although rare, numbering about 9,000 plants total in existence, the species is relatively well protected in its habitat and a proposal for federal protected status was withdrawn.

This plant produces a branching stem, part of which grows underground, lined with rosettes of stiff, waxy, blue-green leaves, up to 45 per rosette. The leaves are thick and somewhat fleshy at the bases, and shreddy and serrated along the edges. The erect inflorescence may be up to 1.6 meters tall, bearing branches lined with tiny flowers each with six whitish tepals a few millimeters long. The fruit is a papery capsule containing reddish brown seeds about half a centimeter wide.

References

External links
Jepson Manual Treatment
USDA Plants Profile
Flora of North America
Photo gallery

interrata
Flora of California
Flora of Baja California
Natural history of the California chaparral and woodlands
Natural history of the Peninsular Ranges
Natural history of San Diego County, California
San Ysidro Mountains
Endangered biota of Mexico